The 2013–14 season was the 117th season of competitive football by Heart of Midlothian, and their 31st consecutive season in the top level of Scottish football, in the newly established Scottish Premiership, which replaced the Scottish Premier League. Hearts also competed in the League Cup and the Scottish Cup.

Summary

Financial problems
On 23 May 2013, Hearts held their Annual general meeting where it was revealed the club faced a £2.5million shortfall in funds for the new season. At the AGM a vote was cast on the resolution to reappoint director and chairman  Roman Romanov to the board, despite an almost unanimous vote against at the meeting the vote was passed by 99.91% on the back of the majority share holders vote. In early June it was revealed the club had failed to pay a one hundred thousand Paye bill and had been given a deadline of 5pm on 11 June to pay the bill. Hearts managed to pay the majority of the sum owed by the deadline but a sum was still owed to HMRC.

On 13 June, the club released a statement saying that the club was facing a significant shortfall in funding, this was depute large deductions in the playing salary at Hearts. The reasons given by the club were lower than expected season ticket sales, increased costs in relation to the upkeep of the stadium and the club's worst league finish in over 30 years the previous season. The club needed around five hundred thousand just to make it to the start of the season, to pay players and any other outstanding bills and as a result, the club's entire playing squad were effectively up for sale. The following day staff wages were due to be paid, and a number of players did not receive their salaries. The club was handed a player registration ban, meaning they would be unable to sign any new players until all payments are brought up to date.

Administration
On 17 June, the club announced they planned to appoint an Administrator, having lodged their intention to do so in court. On 19 June, the club formally entered Administration with administrator BDO being appointed, and as a result were deducted fifteen points for the coming season by the Scottish Premier League and banned from registering players until out of Administration. The club were also cited by the Scottish Football Association for breaking their rule Rule 14(g): "suffering an insolvency event by entering into administration". Administrators set fans a target of 3,000 further season ticket sales in order to raise around £800,000 to keep the club running during Administration, with the target being reached by 12 July.

On 27 June, BDO set a deadline of 12 July for bids for the club to be submitted to them. Three bids were received, one from the Foundation of Hearts, one from HMFC Limited backed by American firm Club 9 Sports and former Livingston owner Angelo Massone through Five Stars Football Ltd. On 29 July 2013, HMFC Limited's bid was rejected and the remaining bidders advised that the current CVA offers would need to be increased as they were “not satisfactory” to Ukio Bankas one of Hearts main creditors. On 15 August, The Foundation of Hearts a fan backed group were awarded preferred bidder status.

On 6 January 2014, Bryan Jackson revealed that BDO had tried to get the SFA to lift the transfer sanctions against the club, however this has been rejected. He also backed the manager, despite poor results and the club dropping 20 points behind their nearest rival. He said: "We're sticking with Gary and hopefully Gary's sticking with us. He's shown fantastic loyalty since we went into administration and we have to show the same to him. Commenting on whether a new manager could do any better he said: Gary's doing incredibly well with the resources that he has. Anybody else coming in, they're going to have the same resources. You also have to remember that we're here, hopefully in a temporary capacity. So, that's a major decision and something to be considered for the future. That would be for new owners rather than the administratorsFriendlies
Hearts returned for pre-season training on 27 June, before heading to England  to take on Romanian side Dinamo Bucharest. On return to Scotland the club travelled to Dunfermline to compete in a fundraiser with gates been shared equally by both clubs and to compete for the Supporters Direct Cup. Hearts pre-season preparations continued with trips to face Raith Rovers and Queen of the South, before heading to Belfast to take part in a mini tournament against Crusaders and a Liverpool XI.

The only friendly to take place at Tynecastle was held as a fundraiser, on an international week in November, against German side Wolfsburg. Hearts held the Bundesliga to a 0–0 draw with the game marking the first team debuts of Adam King, Angus Beith and Jack Hamilton.

Fixtures

Scottish Premiership

The fixture list for the first 33 Scottish Premiership matches in the 2013–14 season was announced on 19 June. Hearts were given an away game to start the season against St Johnstone, and as a result of entering Administration Hearts started the season on minus fifteen points. It took Hearts until 25 January 2014, to reach positive points, where a win over Ross County put them on plus two points.

The club's relegation from the Scottish Premiership was confirmed on 5 April 2014, for the first time since 1981. Hearts won 4–2 away to Partick Thistle, however St Mirren beat Motherwell 3–2, subsequently making it impossible for Hearts to catch up. Hearts were sat on thirteen points, seventeen behind nearest rival Partick Thistle.

Fixtures

 

 

	

League Cup

Having not qualified for the Europa League, Hearts entered the League Cup at the second round stage. The draw was held on 7 August 2013 and the club were drawn away from home against Raith Rovers, just over a month following their pre-season win over the Championship side. Liam Fox opened the scoring early in the second half for the home side before Jamie Hamill equalised from the penalty spot. Raith Rovers then had Dougie Hill sent off and with the sides level at 1–1 following extra time penalties were taken. Hearts went on to win the match 5–4 on penalties in a dramatic shoot out, with 16 penalties being taken in total.

The club were then drawn for the third round with another pre-season opponent Queen of the South. Hearts went ahead early on through Kevin McHattie before Ryan McGuffie equalised just six minutes later. The second half continued where the first began with Jamie Hamill scoring from the Penalty Spot just six minutes into the half after Jamie Walker was taken down in the box before Michael Paton leveled the game forcing extra time. Just two minutes in to added time club captain Danny Wilson put the side ahead for the third time before once again being pegged back with Chris Higgins scoring the equaliser just 3 minutes before the end of extra time forcing the match to penalties. Hearts progressed defeating Queens 4–2 in the shoot out, meaning the club had won four out of their last five league cup fixtures on Penalties.

The draw for the Quarter-final took place the following day with Hearts being drawn against Edinburgh Derby rival Hibernian (Hibs) at Easter Road. Hibs dominated the early stages of the encounter, however Ryan Stevenson scored against the run of play from 25 yards out after 34 minutes to separate the two sides. The Easter Road could not recover and their captain James McPake was sent off in the 84th minute for a two footed tackle on Callum Paterson. Hibernian manager Pat Fenlon resigned two days later.

For the Semi-final the club were drawn with fellow Scottish Premiership side Inverness Caledonian Thistle, a repeat of the same round the previous season.

Fixtures

Scottish Cup

The draw took place on 5 November and the club were given a home tie against Scottish Champions Celtic.

Fixtures

First team player statistics

Captains

Squad information
This section includes all players who have been part of the first team during the season. They may not have made an appearance. Last updated 10 May 2014       

   

   
   
   
   
  
   
   
   
  
   
   
   
    

   
     
      
      
   
    
 
     
   

Appearances (starts and substitute appearances) and goals include those in The Scottish Premiership, Scottish Cup and the League Cup.

Disciplinary record
During the 2013–14 season, Hearts players have been issued with eighty-eight yellow cards and five red. The table below shows the number of cards and type shown to each player. In addition, Danny Wilson was given a one-match ban for using foul and abusive language during an incident in the tunnel following Hearts 2–1 victory over Aberdeen on 24 August 2013, meaning he missed their league clash against Inverness Caledonian Thistle the following weekend. Hearts appealed the red card shown to Kevin McHattie, however this was dismissed by the SFA and he missed the same fixture. The club also appealed the red card issued to Jamie Hamill during the following week's match against Inverness for deliberate handball, after replays showed the ball had actually struck the player on his head. The referee admitted the mistake prior to the hearing, at which the card was overturned. On 18 January 2014, Ryan Stevenson was sent off for violent conduct following an incident with Alan Mannus whilst trying to recover the ball after Hearts second goal. As a result, he incurred an automatic two-match ban, which was served in the league fixture against Ross County and the rearranged match against St Mirren. Following his sending off against Ross County on 19 April, Hamill was charged with excessive misconduct for knocking County manager Derek Adams to the ground after colliding whilst running along the touchline. Hamill ultimately received a four match ban for the incident, one of which was deemed to have been served and another suspended. With only one game of the season remaining, one match of the ban will be carried over to the following season.

Having gone over the SFA disciplinary points threshold, Jamie Hamill, Scott Robinson, Kevin McHattie, Callum Paterson and Danny Wilson served one-match bans over the course of the season.Last updated 10 May 2014 Top scorers  Last updated on 10 May 2014Clean sheets
{| class="wikitable" style="font-size: 95%; text-align: center;"
|-
!width=15|  
!width=15|
!width=15|
!width=150|Name
!width=80|Premiership
!width=80|League Cup
!width=80|Scottish Cup
!width=80|Total
|-
|1
|GK
|
|Jamie MacDonald
|6
|1
|0
|7
|-
|
|
|
! Totals !! 6 !! 1 !! 0 !! 7

 Own goals  Last updated on 10 May 2014Team statistics

League table

Division summary

Management statisticsLast updated on 10 May 2014''

Club

Club staff

Boardroom

Management
Hearts were managed by Gary Locke, having signed a deal on his appointment until the end of the 2013–14 season. On 1 July, Billy Brown returned to the club as assistant manager on a voluntary basis, replacing Edgaras Jankauskas who left the club at the end of the previous season. On 11 September 2013, Brown signed a short contract with the club, extending his stay until at least the end of January 2014. Administrators BDO announced in mid January that Brown would leave his contract early following the St Johnstone match on 19 January, in a bid to cut running costs further. He was later given a reprieve to see out the end of his contract and ultimately this was extended further until the end of February, then again until the end of March. On completion of that contract Brown was advised that the club could no longer afford his wage, Brown once again choose to continue and work for free.

In October 2013, Player Development Manager Darren Murray left the club after 14 years to become under-18 coach at Coventry City. Former Hearts player Robbie Neilson returned to the club to take up the role.

Playing kit
Hearts kits were manufactured by Adidas for the 2013–14 season, having signed a long term deal the previous year. Wonga.com remained as the club's shirt sponsor for the third consecutive season, having signed a one-year extension to their original deal signed in 2011. The club's new away kit went on sale on 23 May, priced at £41.99 for an adults top with kids priced at £31.99. The new home kit was due to go on sale a month later on 20 June, with the same pricing. however was delayed until 4 July, because of shipping problems from Adidas.

International selection
Over the course of the season a number of the Hearts squad were called up to represent Scotland at youth level. Brad McKay, Jack Hamilton, Kevin McHattie, Jason Holt, Jamie Walker, David Smith, Callum Paterson and Jordan McGhee were called up to represent the under-21 squad. Adam King, Jordan McGhee and Sam Nicholson were called up to the under-19 squad. Aaron Scott was called up to the under-17 squad, whilst Sean McKirdy, Leon Jones and Greg Page were called up to the represent the under-16's.

Club and player awards

Deaths
The following players and people associated with the club died over the course of the season. Former winger Johnny Hamilton, former youth player Jamie Skinner, former player Wilfred Allsop, former defender James Pithie, former under-19 player Steven Slater and former manager and player Sandy Jardine.

Transfers
Prior to the end of the previous season Hearts announced it would not be offering new deals to Danny Grainger, Darren Barr, Gordon Smith, Denis Prychynenko and Fraser Mullen, as the club continued to bring down their wage bill. Further departure announcements followed with Mehdi Taouil, and youth player George Scott also not offered new deals. On 31 May, it was announced that Arvydas Novikovas had turned down the offer of a new deal and would leave the club.

On 27 May 2013, Danny Wilson became Gary Locke's first signing as manager on a three-year deal. Wilson had been on loan at the club the previous season. Following the club's move into Administration the deal was believed to be cancelled as Hearts were unable to register him as a player. However, on 30 June, it was announced that the deal would go ahead because although the club could not register new players Wilson's registration was held by the club until 30 June when his loan deal expired. As a result, despite the club's ban on registering new players, Wilson was treated as an existing one extending his contract.

On 27 June, as a result of Administration John Sutton was made redundant by the club, having opted to reject a pay cut.

Having turned down a bid earlier in the season, on 28 January, Administrators BDO accepted an offer from Swansea City for Adam King.

Players in

Players out

Loans in

Loans out

See also
List of Heart of Midlothian F.C. seasons

Notes

References 

2013andndash;14
Heart of Midlothian